Andres Saavedra may refer to:
Andres Saavedra (gymnast) (born 1985), Ecuadorean gymnast
Andrés Saavedra (producer) (born 1982), Colombian music producer